Dr Shivamurthy Shivacharya Mahaswamiji is the founder president of STJ education society and current seer of Taralabalu Jagadguru Brihanmath, Sirigere, . He hails from Sugur village, Shimoga District.

Education
He obtained PhD from Banaras Hindu University. Later pursued post doctoral research from University of Vienna.

Publications
For more than four years,  Shivamurthy Shivacharya Maha Swamiji has been writing a Weekly Column entitled "Bisilu Beladingalu"  on every Thursday in Vijaya Karnataka, a Kannada newspaper.

References

People from Shimoga district
Living people
Indian columnists
Journalists from Karnataka
Year of birth missing (living people)